Brazil has submitted films for the Academy Award for Best International Feature Film since 1960. The award is handed out annually by the United States-based Academy of Motion Picture Arts and Sciences to a feature length motion picture produced outside the U.S. that contains primarily non-English language dialogue. It was not created until the 1956 Academy Awards, in which a competitive Academy Award of Merit was created for non-English speaking films, and has been given annually since.

, 51 Brazilian films have been submitted for the award. Four of these submissions resulted in nominations for the Best Foreign Language Film Oscar, but none of them won. Orfeu Negro, a Portuguese language film shot in Brazil by French director Marcel Camus, won the award at the 1959 ceremony, but it was submitted by the French government and thus France was credited as the only recipient of the award.

Statistics 

Films directed by Carlos Diegues (also known as Cacá Diegues) have been chosen to represent Brazil at the Academy Awards six times, more than any other director. He is followed by Nelson Pereira dos Santos, which had four of his films selected. None of their films, however, managed to achieve an Oscar nomination. Three films by Bruno Barreto were submitted, although his biggest success, Dona Flor and Her Two Husbands, the second highest-grossing film in the history of Brazilian cinema, was not chosen. Four Days in September got nominated in 1998. Suzana Amaral's 1987 film Hour of the Star was the only Brazilian submission by a female director until The Second Mother, directed by Anna Muylaert, was submitted as the Brazilian's entry for the 88th Academy Awards.

Submissions 
Below is a list of the films that have been submitted by the Brazilian government for Academy Award consideration. The Brazilian nominee is selected annually by a committee assembled by the Ministry of Culture (formerly the Ministry of Education and Culture).

See also
 List of Academy Award winners and nominees for Best Foreign Language Film
 List of Academy Awards nominations for Brazilian films
 Cinema of Brazil

Notes

References

Best Foreign Language Film Academy Award submissions by country
Academy Award